Donald Howard Rowe (April 3, 1936 – October 15, 2005) was an American player and pitching coach in professional baseball. A left-handed pitcher, Rowe had a 14-year professional career and spent only one partial season in Major League Baseball as a member of the  New York Mets.

Rowe was a native of Brawley, California, and attended Long Beach State University. He originally signed with the Pittsburgh Pirates in 1954, and in his tenth pro season, he debuted with the Mets on April 9, 1963. His final appearance was on July 18, 1963. After retiring from playing, Rowe became the pitching coach for the Chicago White Sox in 1988 (although he was forced to step aside because of ill health in June) and the Milwaukee Brewers from 1992 to 1998, and worked as a pitching coach in the farm systems of the California Angels, San Francisco Giants, White Sox and Brewers. He also coached football, baseball and tennis at Golden West College, Huntington Beach, California.

Rowe died from Parkinson's disease in Newport Beach, California, at the age of 69.

References

External links

Baseball Reference (Minors)
Baseball Gauge
Retrosheet
Venezuelan Professional Baseball League

1936 births
2005 deaths
Baseball players from California
Buffalo Bisons (minor league) players
Chicago White Sox coaches
Columbus Jets players
Neurological disease deaths in California
Deaths from Parkinson's disease
Hollywood Stars players
Leones del Caracas players
American expatriate baseball players in Venezuela
Lincoln Chiefs players
Major League Baseball pitchers
Major League Baseball pitching coaches
Milwaukee Brewers coaches
Mobile Bears players
New York Mets players
Phoenix Stars players
People from Brawley, California
Portland Beavers players
Salt Lake City Bees players
Waco Pirates players
Compton High School alumni